Ziguinchor Department is one of the 45 departments of Senegal, one of three located in the Ziguinchor Region in the south-west of the country.

The department has a single urban commune, that of Ziguinchor

The department is also  divided administratively into two arrondissements, Niaguis Arrondissement and Nyassia Arrondissement which are in turn split into rural communities (Communautés rurales).

Niaguis Arrondissement:
 Adéane
 Niaguis
 Boutoupa-Camaracounda
Nyassia Arrondissement:
 Enampore
 Nyassia

Historic sites 

 Saint-Antoine de Padoue Cathedral, Ziguinchor
 Palais de Justice, Ziguinchor
 Government building, Ziguinchor
 Regional council building, Ziguinchor
 Baobab tree at Boutoupa, Niaguis Arrondissement. (200 years old, a place of worship for women where men were forbidden)
 Grand Mosque of Santhiaba, Ziguinchor
 Cemetery (mixed Islamic and Christian), Route du Sud, Ziguinchor
 Dialang Bantang fromager tree at Niéfoulène Ziguinchor, place of worship for Diola and Mandingo women, Ziguinchor
 Impluvium houses  of the Kingdom of Bandial

References

 
Departments of Senegal
Ziguinchor Region